The Hawaii Audubon Society is a birding and bird conservation organisation in the American state of Hawaii.  It was founded in 1939 by Charles Dunn, is based in Honolulu and is affiliated with the National Audubon Society.  It has over 1,500 members throughout the state and produces a regular newsletter, ‘Elepaio.

The mission of the Hawaii Audubon Society is to foster community values that result in the protection and restoration of native ecosystems and conservation of natural resources through education, science and advocacy in Hawaii and the Pacific.

One initiative of the Hawaii Audubon Society is the Pacific Fisheries Coalition, a joint project between the Society and the Hawai`i Fishermen's Foundation, to promote the protection and responsible use of marine resources through education and advocacy in the Pacific region.

External links
 
 Pacific Fisheries Coalition

Hawaii
 
1939 establishments in Hawaii
Clubs and societies in the United States
National Audubon Society